76 99 is a studio album by the Jamaican singer Prodigal Son, released on June 12, 2012 through Radikal Yawd/VPAL.

He launched this album on June 2, 2012 at Freedom Fest in Kingston, Jamaica.

After closing a distribution deal with VPAL for this album, he says "There is no limit to what we are looking at. We are at the baby stage. I give God thanks. It's a humbling experience. I hope this can open doors, not just for me, but for other Caribbean and Jamaican gospel musicians. If I represent well, then they will start looking at other people. This is definitely a good boost for my career. I am making giant steps and I thank God for this opportunity," in an interview with THE STAR.

Track listing

References

External links
 vpreggae.com

2012 albums
Prodigal Son (musician) albums
VP Records albums